Microsoft Message Passing Interface (MS MPI) is an implementation of the MPI-2 specification by Microsoft for use in Windows HPC Server 2008 to interconnect and communicate (via messages) between High performance computing nodes. It is mostly compatible with the MPICH2 reference implementation, with some exceptions for job launch and management. MS MPI includes bindings for C and FORTRAN languages. It supports using the Microsoft Visual Studio for debugging purposes.

MS MPI can use any physical network, including Gigabit Ethernet, Infiniband and Myrinet, for which a Winsock Direct driver has been provided. The Winsock Direct provider bypasses the TCP/IP stack of the OS and directly provides access to the networking hardware, using transport protocols tailored for the network type. In absence of such drivers, the TCP/IP stack can also be used.

References

External links 
Using Microsoft Message Passing Interface

Windows communication and services
Windows Server